Niva is a weekly newspaper in Belarusian language published by the Belarusian minority in Poland. The newspaper was founded in 1956 in Białystok for Belarusians living in Poland. Niva was an important factor uniting the Belarusian minority in the region. Chief editor is Eugeniusz Wappa.

External links

 Niva on-line
 Niva celebrates its 50 years
 Appeal to stop persecution of Niva

Belarusian diaspora in Europe
Weekly newspapers published in Poland
Belarus–Poland relations
Mass media in Białystok
Publications established in 1956